Hugh Brown (born , date of death unknown) was a Scottish professional golfer who played during the late 19th century. He finished seventh in the 1872 Open Championship.

Early life
Brown was born in Scotland, circa 1850.

Golf career

1872 Open Championship
The 1872 Open Championship was the 12th Open Championship, held 13 September at Prestwick Golf Club in Prestwick, South Ayrshire, Scotland. There were only 8 competitors and the contest started at 10 a.m. There was a strong wind all day which made for difficult playing conditions.

Tom Morris, Jr. won the Championship for the fourth consecutive time, by three strokes from runner-up Davie Strath, having been five shots behind Strath before the final round. He was just  old. Brown shot rounds of 65-73-61=199 and finished in seventh place.

References

Scottish male golfers
1850s births
Year of death missing